Pronothobranchius kiyawensis is a species of killifish from the family Nothobranchiidae which is native to western Africa where it occurs in the drainage basin of Lake Chad.  This species grows to a length of  TL.  This species is found in the aquarium trade.

References

Nothobranchiidae
Fish of Africa
Fish described in 1928
Taxa named by Ernst Ahl